Tank's Prospect (May 2, 1982 – March 2, 1995) was an American Thoroughbred racehorse best known for winning the second leg of the U.S. Triple Crown series, the Preakness Stakes.

Background
Bred by Edward A. Seltzer, he was purchased for $625,000 at the 1983 Keeneland July Selected Yearling sale by trainer D. Wayne Lukas for his client, Eugene Klein. Klein named the horse after Paul "Tank" Younger, a former National Football League player and executive with Klein's San Diego Chargers football team.

Racing career
At age two, Tank's Prospect won his first start, a six-furlong race at California's Santa Anita Park. While he did not win a major race that year, in the inaugural running of the Breeders' Cup Juvenile he finished second to winner Chief's Crown and ahead of third-place finisher Spend A Buck. Racing at age three in 1985, Tank's Prospect won the El Camino Real Derby and Arkansas Derby before running seventh in the Kentucky Derby. He then ran in the Preakness Stakes. Ridden by Pat Day, he caught the favorite, Chief's Crown, close to the finish and won by a head. The winning time of 1:53.4 was, at the time, considered a stakes record, although a commission in 2012 determined that Secretariat is the official record-holder at 1:53.0. In the third leg of the Triple Crown, Tank's Prospect broke down at the top of the stretch in the Belmont Stakes and did not finish the race. The injury ended his racing career.

Stud record
Retired to stud duty, Tank's Prospect met with modest success. One of his best runners, Real Cash, won the American Derby and San Felipe Stakes.

Tank's Prospect was standing at Venture Farms in Aubrey, Texas, when he died on March 2, 1995, from a ruptured arterial blood vessel.

Breeding

References

1982 racehorse births
1995 racehorse deaths
Racehorses bred in Kentucky
Racehorses trained in the United States
Preakness Stakes winners
Thoroughbred family 21-a